Phathana Inthavong (born February 15, 1997 in Vientiane, Laos) is a Laotian swimmer specializing in Freestyle and Backstroke. He swam for Laos at the 2012 Summer Olympics. 
In August 2013 he joined the FINA World Aquatics Championships in Barcelona, Spain.

At the 2012 Summer Olympics, he ranked number 56th of the event.

Early life

Phathana was born and raised in Vientiane, located in the centre of Laos. He studied in Kiettisack International School, 2014 and currently in Dong-a University. Phathana is the second of three children. Phathana began swimming at the age of nine, partly because of the influence of his sisters and partly to provide him with an outlet for his energy. By the age of 12, he swam in the 2009 Southeast Asian Games held in Vientiane, Laos.

At the end of 2010 Phathana and his teammates participated in Lao-Korean Friendship Training Course held by KOICA. The program was in Incheon, South Korea from the 30th of July until 31 August.

Swimming career

World Aquatics Championships

Phathana competed at the 2011 World Aquatics Championships in Shanghai, China between July 16 and 31, 2011. July 29, 2011 he swam 50 Freestyle heat 3 on lane number 8 with the time of 28.94. 
July 30, 2011 he swam 50 Backstroke heat 1 lane number 4 with the time of 35.30.

2011 Southeast Asian Games

2012 Summer Olympics

2014 Asian Games

2012 FINA World Swimming Championships (25 m) – Men's 50 metre freestyle

See also

 Swimming at the 2015 World Aquatics Championships
 Laos at the 2015 World Aquatics Championships
 Laos at the 2013 World Aquatics Championships
 Laos at the 2011 World Aquatics Championships
 2012 FINA World Swimming Championships (25 m)
 2014 FINA World Swimming Championships (25 m)

References 

http://www.the-sports.org/pathana-nthavong-swimming-spf192507.html#tab1
https://web.archive.org/web/20141009141358/http://www.incheon2014ag.org/Sports/Biographies/Athletes_Profile/?ParticCode=5111941&lang=en
http://livescore.eurosport.com/swimming/pathana-inthavong_prs285825/person.shtml
http://www.the-sports.org/pathana-inthavong-swimming-spf192559.html
https://web.archive.org/web/20120728031411/http://www.omegatiming.com/Sport?sport=aq&year=2012

External links
 

1997 births
Living people
Laotian male freestyle swimmers
Swimmers at the 2012 Summer Olympics
Olympic swimmers of Laos
Swimmers at the 2014 Asian Games
People from Vientiane
Asian Games competitors for Laos
Dong-a University alumni